The Wenrohronon or Wenro people were an Iroquoian indigenous nation of North America, originally residing in present-day western New York (and possibly fringe portions of northern & northwestern Pennsylvania), who were conquered by the Confederation of the Five Nations of the Iroquois in two decisive wars between 1638–1639 and 1643. This was likely part of the Iroquois Confederacy campaign against the Neutral people, another Iroquoian-speaking tribe,  which lived across the Niagara River. This warfare was part of what was known as the Beaver Wars, as the Iroquois worked to dominate the lucrative fur trade.  They used winter attacks, which were not usual among Native Americans,  and their campaigns resulted in attrition of both the larger Iroquoian confederacies, as it had against the numerous Huron.
 
After defeating the Huron in 1649, the Iroquois conducted a December 1649 attack against the Tabacco people, who fell in 1650-1651. The Iroquois continued to campaign westwards along the north shores of Lake Ontario. As had happened to the Huron peoples, the sudden unexpected winter attack led to disorganization and isolation of clan groups, and early losses of key towns by the Neutrals in the 1651-53 campaign by the warriors of the League of the Iroquois leading to eventual defeat and displacement (flight by whole villages)<ref
 name="AmHeritageBk">

</ref> of first the Tabacco tribes, then the Neutral groups, as had happened to the Huron.

Geography
Through the first half of the 1600s sources report the Wenrohronon tribe inhabited lands along both ends of the Lakes Erie and Ontario and their connecting river, the Niagara River. This range ran from the west side of the lower Genesee River valley around Rochester, NY (opposite to the territory of the Seneca peoples) and extended westerly along the right bank (eastern) shores of the Niagara River (opposite lands occupied by the main Neutral Nation on the Canadian side of today's river) and from lands at its source (Lake Erie, in the vicinity of Buffalo) continued a comparatively shorter distance along the southern shores at the eastern end of Lake Erie.
 
North to south, it is likely their lands extended up from Lake Ontario farther southerly more than the approximately  shown on the map, possibly to the drainage divide (and Genesee River gorge area) formed atop the terminal moraine left behind by the Laurentide Ice Sheet, but in all likelihood, into a shared hunting ground shared with the Erie tribes near the headwaters of the Allegheny River.

While not well known today even as a tribal name in the aftermath of becoming extinct during generations-long plagues and near continuous internecine warfare, the Wenro People are known primarily through the mentions in the decades the Jesuit Relations were published. The  tribe's villages the Missionaries describe seem to have been reduced to relatively fewer permanent settlements than their neighbors by internecine warfare in the late 16th century before becoming known to the few French who encountered them.
 
Protected by the gorges of the Genesee River on the east, their small territory likely contained few valuable resources save for hunting lands, and their survival between the  oft warring Huron and Iroquois was because they managed to trade simultaneously with both and their presence was valuable as a buffer state.

History
The Wenro were recorded by Franciscan missionary Joseph de La Roche Daillon in 1627, who encountered them at the site of Oil Springs. Daillon noted the tribe's use of crude petroleum (then a largely unknown substance) as an alleged medicine. The editors of American Heritage Magazine writing in the American Heritage Book of Indians suggested the French visitors encountered the Wenro people shortly after they had lost an internecine war, probably with the Senecas, accounting for the relatively small size of their territory, as they were on fair terms with the Erie and good terms with both the Neutrals and Huron at that time, and the Susquehannocks were both remote and have little to compete over in consequence. (De La Roche was likely preceded twelve years prior by Etienne Brule, who passed through an unspecified land "west of Seneca territory" in 1615; Brule did not document anything specific about any of the tribes or lands he encountered.) The Wenro are documented to have conducted a mass migration out of western New York and into Huron territory in 1639, with many dying along the way; the few survivors who completed the trip were accepted into the Huron tribe. 
 
Later in the 1640s-1650s, after the Beaver Wars turned genocidal, they had a falling-out with their former allies, the Neutrals, which made it impossible for the Wenros to withstand their long-time enemies, the Iroquois. To a greater degree than their successive stunning defeats of the Huron people, the Petun, the Neutrals, the Shawnee people (in Ohio), the Wenro were ultimately conquered by the Iroquois nations in a manner closer to the later destruction of the Susquehannocks, and the Erie nations. In the aftermath of battle, there were few survivors and the society was broken.

Iroquoian cultures allowed for survivors to be adopted (assimilated) into the victorious nations, to the point that one French observer in the 1870s estimated the majority of Iroquois were adopted. Many were possibly absorbed into the Seneca Nation, whose descendants inhabit some of their former territory today, but the Erie were given an ultimatum to return Huron and Neutrals sheltered by the tribe, which led to the three years of warfare reducing the Erie Confederation and the Iroquois invasion pushing the Shawnee out of eastern and northern Ohio. Remaining survivors were exiled into Huron territory.

Language

Wenrohronon was an Iroquoian language and thus was related to Susquehannock, Wyandot, Erie and Scahentoarrhonon.

See also
 Allegany Indian Reservation
 Oil Springs Reservation

References

Further reading

External links
http://www.accessgenealogy.com/native/wenrohronon-tribe.htm

Iroquoian peoples
Extinct languages of North America
Indigenous peoples of the Northeastern Woodlands
Native American tribes in New York (state)
Native American tribes in Pennsylvania